Sergej Milinković-Savić (born 27 February 1995), also known mononymously as Sergej, is a Serbian professional footballer who plays as a midfielder for Serie A club Lazio and the Serbia national team.

Milinković-Savić began his professional career at Serbian club Vojvodina and helped them win the Serbian Cup in the 2013–14 season. He joined Belgian club Genk in June 2014, where he played 24 games before transferring to Italian club Lazio one year later. He has made over 250 appearances for Lazio and has won the Coppa Italia once and the Supercoppa Italiana twice. He was named in the Serie A Team of the Year in the 2017–18 season and won the league's Best Midfielder award in the 2018–19 season.

Born in Spain, Milinković-Savić played youth international football for Serbia at under-19, under-20 and under-21 levels. He was a member of the Serbian team that won the 2015 FIFA U-20 World Cup and received the tournament's Bronze Ball award for his performances. He made his senior international debut in 2017 and represented Serbia at the 2018 and 2022 FIFA World Cups.

Early life
Milinković-Savić was born into a sporting family in Lleida, Catalonia, Spain, where his father Nikola Milinković played football professionally at the time. His mother, Milana Savić, was a professional basketball player. He first started training with Sporting CP, while his father was playing in Portugal. He then spent a few years at Grazer AK in Austria before moving to his native Serbia where he broke through as a footballer.

Milinković-Savić is the older brother of Vanja Milinković-Savić, a fellow footballer who plays as a goalkeeper.

Club career

Vojvodina
Milinković-Savić came through the youth academy of Vojvodina. He was one of the midfielders who emerged from the youth squad that won two consecutive national youth championship titles, alongside Mijat Gaćinović and Nebojša Kosović. Consequently, Milinković-Savić signed his first professional contract with the club on 26 December 2012, penning a three-year deal.

Milinković-Savić made his senior debut in a 3–0 away loss to Jagodina on 23 November 2013. He scored his first goal in a 1–1 away draw with Spartak Subotica on 9 March 2014. In total, Milinković-Savić made 13 league appearances and scored three goals in the 2013–14 season. He also helped Vojvodina win the 2013–14 Serbian Cup in the club's centennial year.

Genk
In June 2014, Milinković-Savić signed a five-year contract with Belgian club Genk and was given the number 20 shirt. He made his competitive debut for the club in a 1–1 home league draw with Cercle Brugge on 2 August 2014. Milinković-Savić scored his first goal for Genk in a 1–1 away league draw against Lokeren on 18 January 2015. He scored a total of five league goals in 24 appearances during the 2014–15 season.

Lazio

On 31 July 2015, it was announced that Milinković-Savić would join Italian club Lazio. He made his debut for the side in a 1–0 home win over Bayer Leverkusen in the first leg of the Champions League play-off round on 18 August 2015. Milinković-Savić scored his first goal for Lazio in a 1–1 Europa League draw with Dnipro Dnipropetrovsk on 17 September 2015. He scored his first Serie A goal in a 3–1 away win over Fiorentina on 9 January 2016. Throughout his debut season, Milinković-Savić made 35 appearances and scored three goals for Lazio in all competitions.

In his second season at Lazio, Milinković-Savić scored seven goals from 39 appearances (league and cup).

On 5 December 2021, Milinković-Savić became the highest-scoring midfielder in Lazio's history following his goal against Sampdoria. He beat previous holder Pavel Nedvěd, who had the record of 33 goals for over a decade.

International career

Youth
Milinković-Savić represented Serbia at under-19, under-20 and under-21 levels. He played for Serbia at the 2013 UEFA Under-19 Championship, winning the gold medal. He played the full 90 minutes in four out of five games, including the final match of the competition against France that Serbia won 1–0. Subsequently, Milinković-Savić appeared at the 2014 UEFA Under-19 Championship, as the team was eliminated in the semi-final by Portugal after penalties. He missed Serbia's last spot-kick in the penalty shoot-out.

The following summer, Milinković-Savić was one of Serbia's most influential players at the 2015 FIFA U-20 World Cup, as the team won the tournament. He appeared in six out of seven games and scored one goal against Mali in the group stage. Due to his performances during the tournament, Milinković-Savić was awarded the Bronze Ball.

In the summer of 2017, Lazio prevented Milinković-Savić from playing at the 2017 UEFA European Under-21 Championship.

Senior
In October 2015, Milinković-Savić received his first call-up to the full squad by manager Radovan Ćurčić for Serbia's UEFA Euro 2016 qualifiers against Albania and Portugal. He remained an unused substitute in both games. In May 2016, Milinković-Savić was selected by newly appointed manager Slavoljub Muslin for friendly matches against Cyprus, Israel, and Russia. However, after failing to receive any playing time in the first two games, Milinković-Savić left the team in agreement with Muslin who said that some other players better fit into his tactical formations.

On 30 October 2017, it was announced that Serbia caretaker manager Mladen Krstajić included Milinković-Savić in the squad for friendlies against China and South Korea.

In June 2018, he was selected in the Serbian squad for the 2018 World Cup, playing all three group stage matches.

Milinković-Savić scored his first two senior international goals on 8 October 2020, settling a 2–1 win over Norway in the semi-finals of the Euro 2020 qualifying play-off.

In November, 2022 he was selected in Serbia's squad for the 2022 FIFA World Cup in Qatar. He played in all three group stage matches, against Brazil, Cameroon, and Switzerland. He scored a goal in a group stage match match against Cameroon, on assist from Andrija Živković.  Serbia finished fourth in the group.

Style of play
Sergej Milinković-Savic is a versatile central midfield player and is capable of playing in several roles, including as a trequartista, or in a holding role, although he is usually deployed as a central midfielder, in the mezzala role. His style of play has drawn comparisons to Zinedine Zidane and Yaya Touré, as he blends the traditional attacking movement, positional sense, and finishing ability of an attacking midfielder, with the height and physicality of a target man or defensive midfielder; as such, he also is effective in the air, and is capable of scoring goals with his head as well as either foot, by making late runs from behind into the penalty area, or striking from distance. He possesses good technique, tactical intelligence, vision, and passing ability, despite his limited pace, as well as tenacity and excellent defensive work-rate, which enables him to help out at both ends of the pitch, carry the ball, and start attacking plays after winning possession. He has been nicknamed ‘il Sergente’ (the Sergeant) by Lazio fans for his charisma, physical dominance and for the assonance with his name.

Career statistics

Club

International

Scores and results list Serbia's goal tally first, score column indicates score after each Milinković-Savić goal.

Honours
Vojvodina
 Serbian Cup: 2013–14

Lazio
 Coppa Italia: 2018–19
 Supercoppa Italiana: 2017, 2019

Serbia U19
 UEFA European Under-19 Championship: 2013

Serbia U20
 FIFA U-20 World Cup: 2015

Individual
 FIFA U-20 World Cup Bronze Ball: 2015
 Serie A Team of the Year: 2017–18, 2021–22
 Serie A Best Midfielder: 2018–19
 Serie A Player of the Month: December 2019, January 2021
 Lazio Player of the Season: 2020–21, 2021–22

References

External links
Player profile at Serbian National Team page

Association football midfielders
Belgian Pro League players
1995 births
Serbian footballers
Spanish footballers
Footballers from Catalonia
Living people
FK Vojvodina players
Grazer AK players 
Sporting CP footballers
K.R.C. Genk players
Sportspeople from Lleida
Serbia under-21 international footballers
Serbia youth international footballers
Serbian expatriate footballers
Spanish expatriate footballers
Serbian expatriate sportspeople in Belgium
Serbian expatriate sportspeople in Italy
Serbian expatriate sportspeople in Austria
Serbian expatriate sportspeople in Portugal
Serbian SuperLiga players
Serie A players
Spanish people of Serbian descent
S.S. Lazio players
2018 FIFA World Cup players
2022 FIFA World Cup players
Serbia international footballers
Spanish expatriate sportspeople in Belgium
Spanish expatriate sportspeople in Italy
Spanish expatriate sportspeople in Austria
Spanish expatriate sportspeople in Portugal
Expatriate footballers in Belgium
Expatriate footballers in Italy
Expatriate footballers in Portugal
Expatriate footballers in Austria